The 2019–20 season was Irish provincial rugby union side Connacht Rugby's nineteenth season competing in the Pro14, and the team's twenty-fourth season as a professional side. It was Andy Friend's second season in charge of the side.

In the regular season, Connacht were placed in Conference B of the Pro14, after spending the previous two seasons in Conference A. As well as playing in the Pro14, the team competed in the Champions Cup in Europe on the back of the previous season's league performance. They were drawn into pool 5 with Gloucester, Montpellier and Toulouse, and finished bottom of the table. In addition to the league and European competitions, the Connacht Eagles development side again competed in the Celtic Cup. The Eagles finished third in the regular season of the eight-team competition, just two points behind finalists Ulster A.

On 12 March 2020, with 13 of Connacht's 21 fixtures in the regular season of the Pro14 completed, the league was put on indefinite hiatus due to the coronavirus pandemic. The competition resumed in August, with the remaining fixtures replaced by two rounds of derby games for each team. Connacht ultimately finished fourth in their conference. This was enough to earn entry to the 2020–21 Champions Cup after it was expanded to 24 teams on a one-season basis due to the pandemic.

Coaching and management team
Note: Flags indicate national union as has been defined under WR eligibility rules. Individuals may hold more than one non-WR nationality.

Players

Senior playing squad

Academy squad

Senior team transfers
Unlike most seasons, where the bulk of transfers occur during the summer pre-season the 2019–20 season saw two separate periods of major transfer activity. Many moves scheduled to happen at the end of the season instead took place during the extended hiatus from March to August 2020.

May 2019 – March 2020

Players in
PR  Matthew Burke promoted from Academy
PR  Rory Burke from  Nottingham
PR  Conor Kenny promoted from Academy
PR  Paddy McAllister from  Gloucester
BR  Paul Boyle promoted from Academy
SH  Stephen Kerins promoted from Academy
SH  Angus Lloyd from  Clontarf
FH  Conor Fitzgerald promoted from Academy
CE  Tom Daly from  Leinster
WG  Stephen Fitzgerald from  Munster
WG  John Porch from  Australia Sevens
FB  Will Goddard from  Brumbies Academy (short-term loan)

Players out
PR  Conor Carey to  Worcester Warriors
PR  Conán O'Donnell to  Sunwolves
LK  James Cannon to  Ealing Trailfinders
LK  Peter Claffey to  Terenure College
BR  James Connolly to  Nottingham
SH  Conor McKeon retired
SH  James Mitchell to  Northampton Saints
FH  Craig Ronaldson to  Lansdowne
CE  Eoin Griffin retired
FB  Will Goddard to  Brumbies Academy (end of loan)
FB  Cian Kelleher to  Leinster

May 2020 – August 2020

Players in
PR  Jack Aungier from  Leinster
PR  Jordan Duggan promoted from Academy
LK  Óisín Dowling from  Leinster
LK  Niall Murray promoted from Academy
BR  Seán Masterson promoted from Academy
BR  Conor Oliver from  Munster
BR  Abraham Papali'i from  Bay of Plenty
SH  Colm Reilly promoted from Academy
FH  Conor Dean promoted from Academy
CE  Sammy Arnold from  Munster
WG  Ben O'Donnell from  Australia Sevens
WG  Peter Sullivan promoted from Academy
WG  Alex Wootton from  Munster (season-long loan)

Players out
HK  Tom McCartney retired
PR  Rory Burke released
PR  Peter McCabe to  Bristol Bears
LK  Joe Maksymiw to  Dragons
BR  Robin Copeland to  Soyaux Angoulême
BR  Colby Fainga'a to  Lyon
BR  Eoin McKeon released
SH  Angus Lloyd retiring
FH  David Horwitz to  Randwick
CE  Kyle Godwin to  Western Force
WG  Niyi Adeolokun to  Bristol Bears
FB  Darragh Leader released

Results

Pro14

Conference Rounds 1 to 13

Additional Derby Rounds

Champions Cup

Pool 5

Notes

References

Connacht Rugby seasons